Boranchi (Boranşı) is a rural locality (a selo) in Karagassky Selsoviet, Nogaysky District, Republic of Dagestan, Russia. The population was 545 as of 2010. There are 11 streets.

Geography 
It is located 27 km northwest of Terekli-Mekteb.

Nationalities 
Nogais live there.

References 

Rural localities in Nogaysky District, Dagestan